Teiichi (written: 貞一) is a masculine Japanese given name. Notable people with the name include:

, Japanese footballer
, Japanese sprinter
, Japanese composer
, Japanese general
, Japanese general

Fictional characters
, protagonist of the manga series Dusk Maiden of Amnesia

Japanese masculine given names